Per-Gunnar Andersson may refer to:

 Per-Gunnar Andersson (rally driver) (born 1980), Swedish rally driver and the Junior World Rally Champion in 2004 and 2007
 Per-Gunnar Andersson (racing driver) (born 1957), Swedish multiple touring car champion